Samuel Kaplan (June 5, 1898 - August 23, 1931) was an American football end who played for the Washington Senators of the National Football League (NFL), which was known as the APFA at the time. He died on August 23, 1931 at the age of 33.

References

1898 births
1931 deaths
Washington Senators (NFL) players